Daniel Gwyn Evans (born 31 July 1973) is a Welsh actor and director.

Background 
Evans was born in the Rhondda Valley in Wales. Evans started acting early in life, going to the Urdd Eisteddfod, and beginning to compete there from the age of five or six, as well as going to many amateur productions. He realised it was what he wanted to do aged 8, and aged 17, he won the Richard Burton Memorial Prize at the National Eisteddfod of Wales. A year later, he won the Chair at the Urdd Eisteddfod.

He attended Ysgol Gyfun Rhydfelen near Pontypridd, a Welsh-language secondary school which has nurtured many actors.

Career

Stage career 
Evans trained at the Guildhall School of Music and Drama from 1991 to 1994, but joined the Royal Shakespeare Company before completing his course. With the RSC he had small roles in Coriolanus and Henry V, before playing Lysander when Adrian Noble's production of A Midsummer Night's Dream toured in New York City and on Broadway.

He appeared in the controversial play Cardiff East by Peter Gill at the Royal National Theatre in 1997, and as the title role in Peter Pan, alongside Ian McKellen and Claudie Blakley.

Directed by Trevor Nunn, he appeared in The Merchant of Venice and Troilus and Cressida, and was then cast as the hero in the operetta Candide, which also starred Simon Russell Beale. It was his first singing role, and saw him nominated for the Laurence Olivier Award for Best Actor in a Musical in 2000.

As well as Shakespeare and traditional theatre, Evans had starred in several more experimental plays. At the Royal Court Theatre, he appeared in the débuts of two Sarah Kane plays: Cleansed and 4.48 Psychosis.

After the success of Candide, Evans was soon cast in another singing role, this time the Stephen Sondheim musical Merrily We Roll Along, for which he won the Laurence Olivier Award for Best Actor in a Musical (2001).

Returning to Shakespeare, he played Ariel in Michael Grandage's production of The Tempest at the Sheffield Crucible, with Derek Jacobi starring as Prospero. For this, and for his performance in the play Ghosts, he was awarded second prize for the Ian Charleson Award in 2003. With the Royal Shakespeare Company again, he appeared in Measure for Measure and Cymbeline.

In November 2005, he starred in another Sondheim musical, Sunday in the Park with George at the Menier Chocolate Factory in the West End, playing the role of French Post-Impressionist painter Georges Seurat, opposite Anna-Jane Casey. It was directed by Sam Buntrock, and was a daring production, using extensive animation and projections to show the creation of Seurat's masterpiece, A Sunday Afternoon on the Island of La Grande Jatte as it was put together over the course of the play.

At the end of its short run at the Menier, Sunday transferred to the larger Wyndham's Theatre, where it continued until September 2006. It won five Olivier awards, including Best Actor for Evans, Best Actress for Jenna Russell, who took over Casey's role when the Menier run finished, and Outstanding Musical Production.

In January 2008, Sunday started previews at Studio 54, on Broadway, New York, with Evans and Russell reprising their parts, and a new cast from the Roundabout Theatre Company. It opened on 21 February 2008 and closed on 29 June. The revival was nominated for, but failed to win, 9 Tony Awards, including Best Actor in a Musical for Evans, Best Actress in a Musical for Russell, and Best Direction of a Musical for Sam Buntrock. Evans was also nominated for an Outer Critics' Circle Award for Outstanding Actor in a Musical, a Drama League Award for a Distinguished Performance, and a Drama Desk Award for Outstanding Actor in a Musical, although the prizes were taken by Paulo Szot (Outer Critics' Circle and Drama Desk), and Patti LuPone, respectively.

Television and film career 
On television, he has worked extensively with the BBC, especially in period dramas, including Great Expectations with Ioan Gruffudd, Daniel Deronda with Hugh Dancy, and The Virgin Queen with Anne-Marie Duff.

Evans has also had cameo appearances in the long-running series, Spooks, Dalziel and Pascoe and Midsomer Murders.

He starred as Daniel Llewellyn in the 2005 Christmas special of Doctor Who, which introduced David Tennant as the 10th Doctor.

He appeared in The Passion in Holy Week, as St Matthew.

Evans has appeared in eight films to date: A Midsummer Night's Dream, Cameleon, Be Brave, The Barber of Siberia, Y Mabinogi, Tomorrow La Scala!, The Ramen Girl. and Les Misérables

Directing career 
Evans débuted as a director in 2005 with a double-bill of Peter Gill's plays: Lovely Evening and In the Blue, and a year later directed a Welsh-language production of the play Esther. That year he also directed a reading of Total Eclipse, by Christopher Hampton, for the Royal Court Theatre's 50th Anniversary, a show which he starred in at the Menier Chocolate Factory in 2007.

In 2007 Evans returned to Guildhall to direct a student production of Certain Young Men, also by Peter Gill, with a cast of eight final year students.

On 8 April 2009, Evans was named as successor to Samuel West as artistic director of Sheffield Theatres. He took up his new role following the refurbishment of the Crucible Theatre, with his first season in February 2010. Evans has stated that he does not plan on giving up acting for directing: "I don't intend to give up acting … for the immediate future".

In 2013, Evans directed the Simon Beaufoy play The Full Monty.

In 2013, Evans directed the Lionel Bart musical Oliver Twist at the Crucible Theatre, Sheffield.

Evans directed American Buffalo at Wyndham's Theatre in 2015, and Show Boat at the Crucible Theatre in 2015, and again in 2016 at the New London Theatre following its transfer to the West End.

In December 2015, he was appointed the new artistic director at Chichester Festival Theatre and succeeded Jonathan Church in July 2016. His productions have included Forty Years On, Fiddler on the Roof, Quiz (2017, also West End 2018), Me and My Girl, Flowers for Mrs Harris (2018), This Is My Family (2019), South Pacific (2021, also UK tour 2022) and Our Generation (2022 - also Royal National Theatre).

On 21 September 2022, it was announced that Evans with Tamara Harvey will become joint Artistic Director of the Royal Shakespeare Company succeeding Gregory Doran (as Emeritus Artistic Director) and Erica Whyman (Acting Artistic Director) from June 2023.

Personal life 
Evans has been openly gay since he became an actor, which he saw as a childhood vocation. Interviewed by The Daily Telegraph in 2014 Evans said things were not easy in his youth and that he was bullied at school, saying: "It wasn't allowed when I was growing up. It was very much a macho culture and the feeling of not belonging to that was very difficult."

In 2011, in an interview with The Guardian, it was revealed that his adolescence was "lived around bus and train trips to Stratford" to watch RSC productions. Commenting on his upbringing in south Wales, Evans said, "My family still live there. They were very liberal, thank god, and still are. They encouraged me."

Filmography

Film

Television

Theatre

Directing credits

Awards and nominations

External links 
 
  Daniel Evans at Hamilton Hodell
  Sunday in the Park with George at Studio 54, Broadway.
 Interview with Daniel Evans todoMUSICALES.com – December 2010

References 

1973 births
Living people
Alumni of the Guildhall School of Music and Drama
Welsh male stage actors
Welsh male television actors
Welsh male film actors
Welsh male radio actors
Welsh male voice actors
Welsh male musical theatre actors
Welsh male Shakespearean actors
Royal Shakespeare Company members
British theatre directors
Laurence Olivier Award winners
Welsh gay actors
Academics of the University of Glamorgan
People educated at Ysgol Gyfun Garth Olwg
Welsh gay musicians
20th-century Welsh LGBT people
21st-century Welsh LGBT people